Incorporated may refer to:
 Incorporated community
 Incorporated (Grip Inc. album), 2004, by Grip Inc.
 Incorporated (Legion of Doom album), 2006
 Incorporated (TV series), a science fiction thriller television series set in 2075

See also 
 Incorporation (disambiguation)
 Unincorporated (disambiguation)
 Corporation